Mozhaysky District is an administrative and municipal district (raion), one of the thirty-six in Moscow Oblast, Russia. It is located in the west of the oblast and borders with Smolensk Oblast in the west, Kaluga Oblast in the south, Shakhovskoy District in the north, Volokolamsky District in the northeast, Ruzsky District in the east, and with Naro-Fominsky District in the southeast. Its administrative center is the town of Mozhaysk. Population: 72,745 (2010 Census);  The population of Mozhaysk accounts for 43.1% of the district's total population.

Geography
Major rivers include the Moskva, the Protva, the Luzha, and the Vorya. Mozhaysk Reservoir is located in the district. About 42% of the district's territory is covered by forests.

History
The district was established in 1929.

References

Notes

Sources

Districts of Moscow Oblast